Daylight is an EP by American hip hop artist Aesop Rock. It was released via Definitive Jux on February 5, 2002. It is also the title of a single from his 2001 album, Labor Days. The song is included on the EP, along with a reworking entitled "Night Light".

Critical reception

In 2015, Daylight was ranked at number 68 on Facts "100 Best Indie Hip-Hop Records of All Time" list.

Track listing

Charts

References

External links

2002 EPs
Definitive Jux EPs
Aesop Rock albums
Albums produced by Aesop Rock
Albums produced by Blockhead (music producer)
Albums produced by El-P